Bleeding Through is an American metalcore band from Orange County, California, formed in 1999. In 2004, Revolver magazine hailed Bleeding Through as one of eight bands ushering in the "Future of Metal" cover story, and Spin called Bleeding Through an "artist to watch" in the magazine's February 2004 issue.

History

Dust to Ashes and Portrait of the Goddess (1999–2002) 
Bleeding Through was formed in 1999 in Woodlake, California. The band's roots can be traced back to 1998, when a band named Breakneck was founded by vocalist Brandan "Ohrly" Schieppati (Eighteen Visions / Throwdown), guitarists Javier Van Huss (Eighteen Visions / Enewetak) and Scott Danough (Daggers), bass guitarist Chad Tafolla (Taken) and drummer Troy Born (Taken). Breakneck played their only show on October 30, 1998, at the Showcase Theatre in Corona, California, opening for Throwdown, Eighteen Visions, Adamantium, Give Until Gone and Swingset in June.

The band witnessed lineup changes, starting with the departure of Van Huss; he was briefly replaced by guitarist Dave Peters (Throwdown / Eighteen Visions), before Tafolla switched from playing bass to guitar. Brandon Conway came in as new bassist until the subsequent recruitment of Marc Jackson (Throwdown / Wrench / Cold War). 

They decided to expand their original hardcore sound by adding elements of black and death metal to their music. The origin of the band's name was explained in an interview as follows: "Well, it is summed up by the explanation that whether black, white, red, brown, yellow, religious preference, straight or gay, we all bleed the same, and we bleed through this life the same. Thus Bleeding Through."

In February 2000, Bleeding Through recorded five songs using a 4-track recorder in Born's bedroom, which were released as the band's demo. The demo was followed by their debut full-length album, Dust to Ashes, released through Prime Directive Records on March 20, 2001. Just prior to entering the studio, Vijay Kumar (of Roundhouse and Cat Burglar) took the bass position and Molly Street enrolled as keyboard player. The addition of keyboards was an unconventional move for a metalcore act as it brought some black metal influences into the music. 

Four months prior to the album being released, Born quit the band but a quickfire substitute was located in Derek Youngsma of Cast in Stone repute. Less than a month after Dust to Ashes was released, the band signed a two album and one EP contract with Indecision Records in April 2001. Tafolla left the band in August 2001, following the band's first tour and was replaced by Brian Lepke.

Severing ties with Eighteen Visions, Schieppati opted to pursue Bleeding Through as a priority upon completion of the Indecision Records 2002 offering Portrait of the Goddess. At this juncture the group comprised the guitar pairing of Scott Danough and Brian Lepke, bassist Mick Morris (replacing Vijay Kumar who played on Portrait of the Goddess) and drummer Derek Youngsma.

This Is Love, This Is Murderous and The Truth (2003–2007) 

After these two relatively under-distributed albums, Bleeding Through signed to a larger label, Trustkill Records in 2003, releasing their third full-length album in September of the same year. Promoting the Ulrich Wild produced This is Love, This is Murderous they embarked upon US nationwide touring, opening for AFI. These dates had propelled the band to national attention albeit for all the wrong reasons. Traveling from Utah to a show in Colorado the group's vehicle hit black ice on the highway, spinning out of control and slamming into a truck that was already flipped over. A mobile TV unit, there to report on another crash, caught the entire incident on film as their equipment trailer rolled and exploded, showering their instruments and gear across the road. Fortunately the band escaped with only minor injuries (Johnson had a minor cut on his head), but due to this accident they had to drop off the "Pure Hatred" tour with Chimaira, Soilwork and As I Lay Dying. The KSL-TV footage of the accident taking place can be viewed in Real Media format on the channel's official site. The dramatic televised footage was broadcast everywhere from CNN Headline News, Good Morning America, NBC News and even The Weather Channel.

This Is Love, This Is Murderous received generally favorable reviews from the mainstream media; Allmusic reviewer, Eduardo Rivadavia wrote that "Bleeding Through's blindingly technical execution provides a constant source of entertainment", and Aaron Troy from DecoyMusic.com called it "the best metalcore release of 2003". The metal community praised it as well, even to a greater extent, with Deadtide.com calling it "a very mature offering from still a young band that will only get better and bigger in the future", Metalrage giving it an 85 score out of 100, The videos for "Love Lost in a Hail of Gun Fire" and "On Wings of Lead" became staples on MTV2's Headbangers Ball and on Fuse TV's Uranium as well. It is also Bleeding Through's most successful album to date with more than 125,000 copies sold.

The following year kicked off with the band's "Mutilation Tour", which culminated in a sold-out performance at The Glasshouse, near their Orange County home that was captured on a live DVD, the next major step in Bleeding Through's career was a spot on Ozzfest 2004, sharing the second stage alongside headline act Slipknot and fellow supports Unearth, Lamb of God, Every Time I Die, Hatebreed, Lacuna Coil and Atreyu. They earned the direct support position on MTV2's third "Headbanger's Ball: The Tour" in November, featuring Cradle of Filth, Arch Enemy and Himsa as touring partners. In an unexpected move, Bleeding Through also donated their rendition of "Rocket Queen" to the Guns N' Roses tribute album Bring You to Your Knees released by Law of Inertia Records in March 2004.  "Love Lost In A Hale of Gunfire" would be used as Roderick Strong's theme song from 2010 until his departure from professional wrestling federation Ring of Honor.

A 2005 re-issue of This Is Love, This Is Murderous added three bonus live tracks, "Revenge I Seek", "Rise" and "Our Enemies", two music videos and a ten-minute documentary. Following this, the band embarked upon European touring in February 2005, supported by Swedes Cult of Luna. In April the group, working with Rob Caggiano as producer, ensconced themselves in Cherokee Studios, Los Angeles to cut a new album billed The Truth.

As This Is Love, This Is Murderous passed the 100,000 sales figure in the US, further touring found the band headlining the second annual "Strhess Fest" in alliance with Darkest Hour, Zao, Misery Signals, and Fight Paris commencing early July. Upon completion of these gigs the group hooked up with the "Warped Tour" for a two-week stretch. November saw shows with Day of Contempt, before the group entered the recording studio to lay down cover versions of Black Flag's "My War", for use on a tribute album, and Unbroken's "Fall On Proverb".

Bleeding Through's The Truth album was released on January 10, 2006, through Trustkill Records. The album was produced by Rob Caggiano, lead guitarist of Anthrax. The band decided to rebuild their sound from the ground up, quoting to Alternative Press as "Taking out the Metalcore, and then adding the metal into hardcore, if that makes any sense." (--Scott Danough, guitarist). "I don't think this album sounds like anything else out there right now. We're very proud of that fact." says guitarist Brian Leppke.

Kerrang! magazine declared that "The Truth" "is about to tear 2006 a new arsehole" upon the album's release in a 4 "KKKK" review (out of 5) while Billboard Magazine hailed the album as "one of the most important" heavy metal albums of the year. A few smaller critics were not so kind: Vik Bansal of musicOMH.com described it as an album that shows "whilst they're not quite there yet, Bleeding Through do have the ability to become bleeding edge", Allmusic's Eduardo Rivadavia's opinion was that the band "played it safe" this time and emphasized their "infuriatingly one-dimensional reliance on victimized, self-pitying lyrics of a middle school maturity level". Although some critics praised the improvement of production, recording, and mixing quality by Rob Caggiano, and the melodic approach to song writing. The album entered the Billboard 200 at No. 48, and No. 1 on the Top Independent Albums.

Promoting The Truth, the band opened 2006 with US dates throughout February and March backed by Every Time I Die, Between the Buried and Me and Haste the Day. The band also put in a significant appearance on the second stage at the Tool, Guns N' Roses and Metallica headlined Download Festival in Castle Donington, UK on June 9. On July 18, Bleeding Through appeared on The Tonight Show with Jay Leno. Stand-up comedian Mitch Fatel joined the band for a song, Brandan Schieppati called this "surreal in the best possible way".

The group once again played on the second stage at the 2006 Ozzfest, now as part of the non-rotating lineup along with Black Label Society, Unearth, Atreyu and Norma Jean. In addition to their own headline dates, they also filled Ozzfest "off dates" with shows supporting Disturbed, Avenged Sevenfold and Hatebreed. The band members were on a day off from the festival passing through Medford, Oregon, when they pulled into a Taco Bell parking lot to eat. This resulted in a fan recognizing them and then calling over a bunch of his friends. The band talked with the fans, signed autographs, posed for pictures and also asked the kids if there were any shows happening that night they could participate in. They ended up doing a small club concert with local bands, with roughly 150 people in attendance. The show was a benefit with all proceeds going toward cancer research.

In April 2007 Danough left the band. "We felt that we had grown apart and it was time for both parties to move on", the band wrote in a statement. After his departure he wrote on his MySpace blog: "..Just know that when this all comes out don't think you've seen the last of Scott. I'm on to the next chapter very soon and I'm excited to see what the future brings." After Danough's departure he was quickly replaced by Jona Weinhofen of Australian band I Killed The Prom Queen – one of several factors that led that band to split up.

Bleeding Through headlined the Darkness Over Europe 2007 Tour with I Killed The Prom Queen, All Shall Perish, and Caliban from February to March. The band then toured as the opening act for the Slayer and Marilyn Manson summer tour.
Following that, the group embarked on a six-week stint across the U.S. and parts of Canada opening for HIM, with the arduous year of touring finally reaching an end with shows in New York City, on December 1 and 2, 2007, while HIM was simply done touring North America and set to move on to Europe.

Declaration (2008–2009) 
In March 2008, Bleeding Through announced Declaration as the title of its fifth studio release, a concept album about the rigors of being away from home. The band's frontman and lyricist Brandan Schieppati explained to Revolver in the magazine's May 2008 issue, "There are definitely places when we're traveling where every time we go there, we're like, 'Fuck, why do we have to be here?' Like, we'll be in France and all of a sudden we'll feel totally insignificant. You get the feeling that people's eyes are just burining a hole through you." The group recorded Declaration between April and May 2008 in Vancouver, Canada with producer Devin Townsend.

On June 6, 2008, the band released a blog on MTV's Headbangers Ball website. The blog addressed numerous disappointments the band had with Trustkill Records. These disappointments included unpaid royalties, lack of funding for Declaration, and an unapproved re-release of their 2006 album The Truth. Despite Trustkill's website saying that the new album, Declaration would be released August 2008, the band stated that they did not intend to hand over the master recording of the album, until they were paid the minimum fees required to pay back producer Devin Townsend, the band's management and Schieppati's father who loaned the band money for recording. In a follow-up blog on their MySpace page, Bleeding Through stated that "Trustkill Records delivered the funds necessary to complete the album and to compensate everyone who had loaned [us] cash."

Following the recording of Declaration, the group appeared at the 2008s Download Festival, which was held from June 13 to 15 at Donington Park, United Kingdom. During the festival, vocalist Brandan Schieppati spoke to Rock Sound TV about the group's dispute with its record label. During the conversation, Schieppati revealed that Bleeding Through has been contacted by a number of other record companies since the band went public with its Trustkill feud. In July 2008, Bleeding Through signed a European deal with German record label Nuclear Blast for the release of Declaration.

The band performed in the US 'No Fear Music Tour' with Bullet for My Valentine in August, and continued to support them throughout Europe with Lacuna Coil in November and December 2008. They also performed in two countries for the first time in 2008: Mexico and Russia. They performed in Mexico City in August as part of the Warped Tour with Underoath and MxPx and headlined four Russian shows in December.

On September 25, 2008, Machine Head frontman Robb Flynn joined the band on stage at The Warfield in San Francisco, and performed Bleeding Through's song "Revenge I Seek". The next day, Declaration was released in Europe by Nuclear Blast and September 30 in the US by Trustkill. The album sold under 6,000 copies in the United States in its first week of release to debut at number 104 on the Billboard 200 chart.

Bleeding Through co-headlined along with Darkest Hour the Thrash and Burn European Tour between April and May 2009. They will also headline "The Declaration Tour" in 2009 along with As Blood Runs Black, Impending Doom, The Acacia Strain. Guitarist Brian Leppke was unable to make it on tour resulting in Demon Hunter's Patrick Judge temporarily filling in for him. In late May 2009, Bleeding Through announced that Jona Weinhofen would be leaving the band and No Use for a Name guitarist Dave Nassie would replace him. Jona cited that while he loved his time in Bleeding Through, he decided that he should leave the band and return home to Australia with his family and friends. Following his departure Jona joined Bring Me the Horizon until January 2013.

The band embarked on a special West Coast tour in August to celebrate their ten-year anniversary, with supporters Carnifex, Miss May I, and Motionless in White. In early June 2009, Bleeding Through signed a deal with the Portland, Oregon-based independent record label Rise Records. Insinuating about the band's previous dispute with its former label Trustkill, Schieppati said, "We're very excited to align with a record label that has so much momentum and is growing when many seem to be faltering, dropping bands and firing employees."

Bleeding Through (2009–2010) 
On October 12, 2009, Bleeding Through issued the statement, "Rest assured that everything is fine as far as The Band is concerned! We’re looking very forward to the Halloween show followed by the creation of our BRAND NEW ALBUM, which we can tell you will take place in December and January before our European tour with Machine Head, Hatebreed and All Shall Perish! That’s right, NEW Bleeding Through album in 2010," confirming the band will release a new album, which was self-titled and released by Rise Records on April 13, 2010, in North America and internationally through Roadrunner Records The album was produced by Zeuss.

The band supported the album with a lengthy tour of Europe, Japan and Australia with Machine Head and Hatebreed in the first part of 2010. This was followed by their own "Spring Breakdown" headlining tour in the US with Born Of Osiris, Sleeping Giant and more. The band returned to Europe for several festivals and a few headlining shows. The group released a video for the song "Anti-Hero". In August 2010 the group headlined the "California United" West Coast tour with Terror and The Ghost Inside. The following month they headlined "The Anti-Hero" tour across the US with support from For Today, After The Burial and more. After that they joined Parkway Drive and Comeback Kid for the European "Never Say Die!" tour. The band closed out 2010 with an appearance at the "Noise for Toyz" benefit show in Fullerton, California and released an iTunes / digital only single through Rise Records which was recorded during the sessions for the self-titled album.

The Great Fire, disbandment announcement and final tours (2010–2014) 
The band planned to write and record their seventh studio album once they returned from touring. They planned to release the yet to be titled album anywhere from mid to late 2011, which bassist Ryan Wombacher explained in a November 2010 interview:

Maybe mid-year; safe to say towards the end but not at the end, maybe like eight months or something like that. Best thing about it is we’re going to do it whenever we want to do it. There is no deadline right now, we don’t have any dates set, we don’t have the studio, we’re going to do the record ourselves. So we will literally go in and record it and it will be probably be done before we sign a contract.

On November 14, 2011, the band announced that the name of their new record would be called "The Great Fire". On November 30, 2011, the band announced that "The Great Fire" was complete, although no release date has been stated. On December 14, 2011, the band revealed The Great Fire's release date as January 31, 2012.

On January 3, 2013, the band announced their upcoming tour in Europe would be their last, leading to rumors that the band would be breaking up. This was later confirmed by a post on the band's Facebook page that they would be finished at the end of the year. The band also stated that they would like to set up an Australian tour during the summer and singer Brandan Schieppati stated in a reply to an Instagram comment that the band would have a final U.S. tour possibly starting in September. November 2013 the band announced final west coast dates will take place in 2014.

Former guitarist and founding member Scott Danough played with the band on the final tours in Australia, Europe and the U.S. He was added to the band's current lineup as of July 2014 on their Facebook page, which is led to believe he has rejoined Bleeding Through.
The first show to kick off 2014 was their final appearance at New England Hardcore & Metal Fest at the Palladium in Worcester Massachusetts on April 17.
The line up was made up of Brandan Schieppati, Scott Danough, Ryan Wombacher, Marta Peterson, Derek Youngsma and Dave Nassie's final appearance with the band in 2014.
In May, the final nine west coast dates were announced with Winds of Plague and Scars of Tomorrow. A majority of the shows the band played were sold out. It was later announced in June that the first three of the west coast dates would be the "This Is Love This Is Murderous" line up which included Brian Leppke on guitar since he hasn't toured with Bleeding Through since 2010.
Sacramento, Portland and Seattle shows featured Declaration era ex member Jona Weinhofen on guitar. In July another show on August 2 was added at Chain Reaction because the August 3 show sold out. The final show was on August 3.
Brandan Schieppati's podcast he made it clear the final shows were very emotional and he realized how well they all played together. He said something may come from the band in the future.

Reunion and Love Will Kill All (2018–present) 

On January 1, SharpTone Records issued a teaser for music they were releasing in 2018 and some listeners apparently recognized vocalist Brandan Schiepatti's voice on their page. On March 28, 2018, the band announced their new album, "Love Will Kill All" and will release on May 25 through SharpTone Records.

On July 1 2022, a new EP was released entitled 'Rage' and would be available on all streaming platforms, after a single with the same title was released May 20.

On December 18, Brandan teased the recording of new material following an Instagram post with the caption, "Just riffing away! Working on some dark new songs."

The band have played a range of shows across the United States throughout 2022 and 2023, including the first night of a celebratory lineup marking Indecision Records' 30th anniversary.

Musical style, influences and lyrical themes 
Bleeding Through's music has been described as metalcore, expanding their hardcore punk roots into death metal territory. Like many metalcore bands, Bleeding Through is influenced by Swedish melodic death metal. It is the most apparent on Dust to Ashes, while with time the band's music got gradually more and more melodic, with The Truth being the most melodic to date, even containing a power ballad, a novelty for the band. A keyboard player was introduced shortly before the band began performing as an unsigned act. According to former guitarist Scott Danough "it adds a different element" to their music.

Former guitarist Scott Danough has said that he is influenced by metal and hardcore bands, like At the Gates, Slayer, Cradle of Filth, Integrity and Earth Crisis. Vocalist Brandan Schieppati has mentioned American thrash metal bands as an influence on Bleeding Through, such as Testament or Exodus. In an interview, guitarist Brian Leppke added Cro-Mags, Entombed, Crowbar and Pantera to the list of influences. Keyboardist Marta Peterson is the one who brings industrial and goth inspirations to the band's sound.

Although the band was often labeled as simply metalcore, when Brandan Schieppati was asked if he considered Bleeding Through a hardcore band, he said: "I think we're a hardcore band and I'll never say we are a metal band, we're all hardcore kids and we came from the hardcore scene. Ours is just a different version of hardcore, we're trying to do something which adds a different variety to the hardcore scene, which has been sounding the same way for so long."

Lyrical themes focuses such themes as pain, hate, loss, love and personal struggles.

Band members

Current lineup
 Brandan Schieppati – lead vocals (1999–2014, 2016, 2018–present)
 Brian Leppke – rhythm guitar (2001–2014, 2016, 2018-present), lead guitar (2018-present)
 Derek Youngsma – drums, percussion (2001–2014, 2016, 2018–present)
 Marta Peterson – keyboards, piano, backing vocals (2003–2014, 2016, 2018–present)
 Ryan Wombacher – bass guitar, backing vocals (2002–2014, 2016, 2018-present)

Former members
 Scott Danough – lead guitar (1999–2007, 2013–2014, 2016), rhythm guitar (2013–2014)
 Javier Van Huss – rhythm guitar (1999)
 Marc Jackson – bass (1999–2000)
 Troy Born – drums (1999–2001)
 Chad Tafolla – bass (1999), rhythm guitar (1999–2001)
 Vijay Kumar – bass (2000–2002)
 Molly Street – keyboards (2000–2003)
 Jona Weinhofen – lead guitar, backing vocals (2007–2009, 2014)
 Dave Nassie – rhythm guitar (2014), lead guitar (2009–2014)

Live musicians
 Mick Morris – bass 
 Rocky Gray – drums 
 Dave Peters – lead and rhythm guitar 
 Patrick Judge – lead and rhythm guitar 
 Manny Contreras – rhythm and lead guitar 
 Mick Kenney – lead guitar 
 Mark Garza – drums 
 Justin Bock - bass  guitar 
 Brandon Richter – lead guitar, backing vocals (2019, 2022-present)
 Robert Bloomfield – bass (2019)
 John Arnold - guitar (2022-present)
 Kory Anderson - guitar (2022) bass (2022)
 Chris Dale - bass (2022)

Timeline

Discography

Studio albums

DVDs 
 This Is Live, This Is Murderous (June 15, 2004, Kung Fu Records)
 Wolves Among Sheep (November 15, 2005, Trustkill Records)

Appearance on compilations 
 MTV2 Headbangers Ball: The Revenge – "Kill to Believe"
 The Best of Taste of Chaos – "On Wings of Lead"
 The Best of Taste of Chaos Two. – "Love in Slow Motion"
 Bring You to Your Knees: A Tribute to Guns N' Roses – "Rocket Queen"
 Threat: Music That Inspired the Movie – "Number Seven with a Bullet"
 Threat: Original Motion Picture Soundtrack (Soundtrack) – "Number Seven with a Bullet"
 AMP Magazine Presents: Volume 1: Hardcore
 Blood, Sweat & Ten Years – "On Wings of Lead" and "Love Lost in a Hale of Gunfire"
 MTV2 Headbangers Ball, Vol. 2 – "Love Lost in a Hail of Gunfire" (censored)
 Fighting Music 2
 Our Impact Will Be Felt: A Tribute to Sick of It All – "We Want the Truth"
 Trustkill Takeover, Vol. II – "One Last Second"
 2005 Warped Tour Compilation – "Love Lost in a Hail of Gunfire"
 Punk Goes '90s – "Stars" – Hum cover
 Black on Black: A Tribute to Black Flag – "My War"
 Metal Hammer 204 – "Anti-Hero"

Music videos

References

External links

 Official website
 Bleeding Through: A Different Package: Shout! Music Webzine on April 1, 2007
 What Bleeding Through Can Do For You: Follow-up Interview with Derek Youngsma

 
1999 establishments in California
Metalcore musical groups from California
Musical groups disestablished in 2014
Musical groups established in 1999
Musical groups from Orange County, California
Musical quintets
Nuclear Blast artists
Rise Records artists
Straight edge groups
Trustkill Records artists